Achaaram is a 2015 Tamil-language crime thriller film written and directed by Mohan Krishna and produced by A. Sankara Padma. The film stars Ganesh Venkatraman, Munna, and Poonam Kaur in the lead roles. The music was composed by Srikanth Deva with cinematography by R. K. Prathap and editing by Suresh Urs. The film released on 19 June 2015.

Synopsis
Suriya, a sub-inspector, hates modern women and kills them secretly at night. When he meets Ramya, the wife of an architect, he becomes obsessed with her.

Cast
 Ganesh Venkatraman as Suriya
 Munna as Siva 
 Poonam Kaur as Ramya
 Rekha
 Gnanadesh Ambedkar
 O. A. K. Sundar as Police officer
 Rajya Lakshmi
 Aishwarya Dutta as Nandhini (cameo appearance)

Soundtrack
The soundtrack was composed by Srikanth Deva, while lyrics written by Yugabharathi.
"Kokkoga" - Nincy Vincent
"Unna Vida Maatten" - MLR Karthikeyan, Srilekha Parthasarathy
"En Veettukku" - Vijay Yesudas
"Amma En" - Nivas
"Perazhagai" - Sooraj Santhosh, Mahathi

Critical reception
Rediff gave the film 2.5 stars out of 5 and called it a "decent thriller". Deccan Chronicle gave the same rating and wrote, "good execution and noteworthy performances make Achaaram a fulfilling experience", while calling it a "tactfully arranged psychological thriller". The New Indian Express wrote, "The debutant director has tried to offer a dark psychological thriller with some freshness. But the screenplay could have been more interestingly crafted and the narrative style more polished. Achaaram is at the most a promising work of a debutant maker". Sify wrote, "Acharam is watchable for the good performance of Ganesh Venkatraman and also for the basic story-line which reflects the current happenings in the society".

References

External links 
 

2015 films
2015 crime thriller films
2010s Tamil-language films
Films scored by Srikanth Deva
Indian crime thriller films